Câu lạc bộ Bóng đá Đồng Nai, simply known as Đồng Nai, is a professional football club, based in Đồng Nai Province, Vietnam, that plays in Vietnamese National Football Third League, the fourth tier of Vietnamese football.

The team is currently playing at Đồng Nai Stadium.

Record as V.League 1 member

Kit suppliers and shirt sponsors

Current squad
As of 14 February 2016

Current coaching staff

Honours

References

External links

Football clubs in Vietnam
1980 establishments in Vietnam